Tecumseh High School is a high school located in Tecumseh, Oklahoma roughly 42 miles East of Oklahoma City . The school nickname is the Savages, and the School's mascot is the Savage. Tecumseh High School serves approximately 659 students in grades 9–12. They have a 41% minority enrollment and a graduation rate of 90-94%.

Athletics 

Tecumseh High School students participate in Baseball, Cross Country, Fast Pitch and Slow Pitch Softball, Track and Field, Basketball, American Football, Powerlifting, Volleyball, Golf, Wrestling, Cheerleading, Bowling, Marching Band, and Colorguard.  They are classified mainly in 4A in their larger sports by the Oklahoma Secondary School Activities Association (OSSAA).

Football

The Football Team is led by Coach Ty Bullock, who came to Tecumseh in 2017 from the Cushing Tigers, where he was the offensive coordinator.  In his 4 seasons of coaching the Savage Football team, he has amassed a career record of 21–22.  In the 3 seasons before his arrival, Tecumseh fell to a 5–26 record.

Softball

The Lady Savage Fast Pitch Softball Team is led by Head Coach Chad Trahan and Assistant Coach Perry Wilson.

Basketball

The Men's Savage Basketball Team is led by Head Coach Bryant Edwards.

The Lady Savage Basketball Team is led by Head Coach Eldon Gentry.  In 1993, the Lady Savage Basketball Team won the school's first and only Team State Championship by defeating Milwood 42–34 to win the 3A State Championship at the Oklahoma State Fairgrounds behind the solid play of 6'3" Cheri Westervelt's Game High 32 Points.   Westervelt went on to play College Basketball at Oklahoma State.

Baseball

The Savage Baseball Team is led by Head Coach Easton Marrs.

Track and Field

The Tecumseh Track Team is led by Coaches Courtney Ozment and Larry Joubert.

Volleyball

The Tecumseh Volleyball team is led by Head Coach Emma Lachapelle.

Wrestling

The Tecumseh Wrestling Team is led by Coach Billy Don Sigman.

Marching Band and Colorguard

The Tecumseh Marching Band is led under the direction of Band Director John Outon and Assistant David Bellows

Tecumseh High School Alumni Association 

Tecumseh High School's alumni association claims to be Oklahoma's oldest active association. The group has met yearly since 1903 and has never missed a beat until the COVID-19 Pandemic of 2020 where they were forced to cancel in 2020 and again in 2021 due to the safety and health of their alumni friends and family. The group publishes a 20-page newspaper each May, which is sent to more than 4,000 graduates.

Alumni 

 Mary Fallin- governor of Oklahoma
 Patrick Cobbs- NFL Football Running Back

See also 
 Board of Education v. Earls

References

External links
Tecumseh High School website

Public high schools in Oklahoma
Schools in Pottawatomie County, Oklahoma